There are currently two types of elections in Singapore: parliamentary and presidential elections. According to the Constitution of Singapore, general elections for Parliament must be conducted within three months of the dissolution of Parliament, which has a maximum term of five years from the first sitting of Parliament, and presidential elections are conducted every six years.

The Parliament of Singapore is unicameral with 93 seats. Since the legislative assembly election in 1959, the People's Action Party (PAP) has had an overwhelming majority, and for nearly two decades was the only political party to win any seats, and has always formed the Government of Singapore.

Parliamentary elections

From Singapore's independence in 1965, to 1981, the People's Action Party (PAP) won every single seat in every election held, forming a parliament with no elected opposition MP for almost two decades. In Singapore, opposition politicians and trade unionists were detained in prison without trial before the 1960s and early 1970s. Many such as Lim Chin Siong, Said Zahari and Lim Hock Siew were accused by the government of being involved in subversive communist struggles. Among them, Chia Thye Poh was detained the longest; he was detained for 23 years without any trial.

From 1984, opposition politicians began being elected in parliament. Two out of the 74 seats went to opposition politicians. Subsequently, in 1988, the PAP won 76 out of the 77 seats; in 1991, PAP won 77 seats out of the 81 seats. In 1997, 2001 and 2006, two opposition candidates were elected during each respective parliamentary election. In 1988, former Solicitor-General of Singapore and opposition politician, Francis Seow was also detained without trial. He was later charged with tax evasion but he fled overseas and sought asylum successfully in the United States. He was convicted of tax evasion in absentia. Workers' Party member Gopalan Nair also fled Singapore in the 1990s. Catherine Lim argues that a climate of fear hurts Singapore. Prominent opposition politicians bankrupted and/or jailed in the 20th century also include J. B. Jeyaretnam, Tang Liang Hong and Chee Soon Juan.

The campaigning time for elections in Singapore remains very short in the 21st century. The legal minimum campaign time, from when the election is announced to polling day, is nine days. This minimum campaigning time is generally used in the elections held in Singapore. The announcement of the election follows the announcement of new constituency boundaries.

Since the implementation of the Group Representation Constituency (GRC), critics have accused the governing party of gerrymandering. The electoral system reduces the chances of opposition representation in Parliament with a "winner takes all" system. As pointed by NGO group Maruah Singapore, it "creates a barrier to entry" for smaller opposition political parties to contest in the general elections as they may find it hard to field a five-member team of talents, it also allows for the "free-riding of untested candidates" who get in on the back of stronger team members, such as the PAP candidates brought in to the Tanjong Pagar GRC, which was uncontested for 14 years when helmed by Prime Minister Lee Kuan Yew. The Elections Department, in charge of redrawing electoral boundaries without the need of parliamentary approval, was established as part of the executive branch under the Prime Minister's Office (PMO), rather than as an independent body. Critics have accused it of giving the governing party the power to decide polling districts and polling sites through electoral engineering, based on poll results in previous elections. Opposition politician Sylvia Lim has stated in Parliament, “The entire electoral boundary re-drawing process is completely shrouded in secrecy, chaired by the secretary to the Cabinet. There are no public hearings, no minutes of meeting published. The revised boundaries are released weeks or even days before Nomination Day. The report makes no attempt to explain why certain single seats are retained while others are dissolved, nor why new GRCs are created or old ones re-shaped.” Cheng San GRC and Eunos GRC were examples of constituencies dissolved by the Elections Department after opposition parties gained ground in elections, with voters redistributed to other constituencies.

However, Freedom House has noted that elections in Singapore are technically free of electoral fraud. Throughout the history of the Republic of Singapore, hundreds of politicians have been elected in Parliament, of whom majority of unique candidates represent the governing People's Action Party including late stalwarts like Lee Khoon Choy. Since 1965, 19 opposition politicians have been elected into Parliament, including J. B. Jeyaretnam, Chiam See Tong, Low Thia Khiang, Ling How Doong, Cheo Chai Chen, Chen Show Mao, Yaw Shin Leong, Png Eng Huat, Lee Li Lian, and also ten incumbent candidates from the Workers' Party including Secretary-General Pritam Singh, Chairwoman Sylvia Lim and MP Faisal Manap.

2020 general election

A general election was called on 23 June 2020, with Singaporeans electing their Members of Parliament (MPs) on 10 July 2020.

Presidential elections

Presidential elections have been held since 1993. Under the "Presidential Elections Act", to run for president, one must obtain a "certificate of eligibility" from the Presidential Elections Committee. To obtain this certificate the candidate must:

 Be a citizen of Singapore.
 Be at least 45 years of age.
 Be a registered voter.
 Be a resident in Singapore at the date of their nomination for election and a resident for periods amounting in the aggregate to not less than ten years prior to that date.
 Not be subject to any of the following disqualifications:
(a) being and having been found or declared to be of unsound mind;
(b) being an undischarged bankrupt;
(c) holding an office of profit;
(d) having been nominated for election to Parliament or the office of President or having acted as election agent to a person so nominated, failing to lodge any return of election expenses required by law within the time and in the manner so required;
(e) having been convicted of an offence by a court of law in Singapore or Malaysia and sentenced to imprisonment for a term of not less than one year or to a fine of not less than S$2,000 and having not received a free pardon, provided that where the conviction is by a court of law in Malaysia, the person shall not be disqualified unless the offence is also one which, had it been committed in Singapore, would have been punishable by a court of law in Singapore;
(f) having voluntarily acquired the citizenship of, or exercised rights of citizenship in, a foreign country, or having made a declaration of allegiance to a foreign country;
(g) being disqualified under any law relating to offences in connection with elections to Parliament or the office of President by reason of having been convicted of such an offence or having in proceedings relating to such an election been proved guilty of an act constituting such an offence.
 Be a person of integrity, good character and reputation.
 Not be a member of any political party on the date of nomination for election.
 Have served for a at least three years in office —
 as Minister, Chief Justice, Speaker, Attorney-General, Chairman of the Public Service Commission, Auditor-General, Accountant-General or Permanent Secretary;
 as chief executive officer (CEO) of a key statutory board or government company: the Central Provident Fund Board, the Housing and Development Board, the Jurong Town Corporation, the Monetary Authority of Singapore, Temasek Holdings, or GIC Private Limited (formerly known as the Government of Singapore Investment Corporation);
 as the most senior executive of a company with an average of $500 million in shareholders' equity for the most recent three years in that office, and which is profitable after taxes; or
 in any other similar or comparable position of seniority and responsibility in any other organisation or department of equivalent size or complexity in the public or private sector which has given him such experience and ability in administering and managing financial affairs as to enable him to carry out effectively the functions and duties of the office of President.

Because of the high requirements needed to run for presidential elections, many presidential elections have been uncontested. All presidential elections have been walkovers except for the first one, held in 1993 which was contested by two people, and the 2011 one, contested by four people. The first presidential election was won by Ong Teng Cheong, a former member of the PAP. Subsequent presidential elections in 1999 and 2005 have been won by S. R. Nathan through walkovers.

The 2011 presidential election was contested by Tony Tan Keng Yam, Tan Cheng Bock, Tan Jee Say and Tan Kin Lian. All candidates except Tan Jee Say were former members of the PAP, whose closest relation to the party was when he served as then-Deputy Prime Minister Goh Chok Tong's principal private secretary from 1985 to 1990. The election was won by Tony Tan with a margin of 0.34% over Tan Cheng Bock.

2011 presidential election results

2017 presidential election

The 2017 presidential election was won by Halimah Yacob through an uncontested walkover.

Referendums
A referendum may also be held for important national issues, although it has been held only once in Singapore's political history for the 1962 merger referendum. Calls for a national referendum has been made since then, including the issue over the building of casinos in Singapore.

Past elections

Legislative Council elections
 1948 general election
 1948 Rural West by-election
 1951 general election
 1952 Seletar by-election

Legislative Assembly elections
 1955 general election
 1957 by-elections
 1959 general election
 1961 by-elections (April and July)

As State of Malaysia
 1963 general election
 1965 Hong Lim by-election

Parliamentary elections

 1966 by-elections (January, March & November)
 1967 by-elections
 1968 general election (First general election as an independent nation)
 1970 by-elections
 1972 general election
 1976 general election
 1977 by-election (May & November)
 1979 by-elections
 1980 general election
 1981 Anson by-election
 1984 general election
 1988 general election
 1991 general election
 1992 Marine Parade by-election
 1997 general election
 2001 general election
 2006 general election
 2011 general election
 2012 Hougang by-election
 2013 Punggol East by-election
 2015 general election
 2016 Bukit Batok by-election
 2020 general election

Other elections

Municipal Commission elections
 April 1949 ordinary election
 December 1949 ordinary election

City Council elections
 1957 ordinary election
 1958 by-election

National referendums
 1962 national referendum

Federal & State elections for Malaysia
 1964 general election

Presidential elections

 1993 presidential election
 1999 presidential election
 2005 presidential election
 2011 presidential election
 2017 presidential election

Party election
 1959 PAP prime ministerial election

Upcoming election
 2023 presidential election

See also

 Electoral calendar

References
Notes

Bibliography

 .

External links

Singapore Elections Department website
Singapore Elections
Adam Carr's Election Archive
National Library of Singapore's resource guide on general elections in Singapore
Constitution of the Republic of Singapore
Parliamentary Elections Act (Chapter 218), The Statutes of the Republic of Singapore

 
Singapore politics-related lists